Sara Rodriguez (born July 25, 1975) is an American registered nurse, health care executive, and Democratic politician. She is the 46th and incumbent lieutenant governor of Wisconsin, having been elected on a ticket with Governor Tony Evers in the 2022 election.  She previously served in the Wisconsin State Assembly, representing the 13th Assembly district during the 2021 session.

Early life and education
Rodriguez was born and raised in the Milwaukee metropolitan area in southeast Wisconsin.  She graduated from Brookfield East High School and earned her B.A. in neuroscience from Illinois Wesleyan University.  Immediately after college, she volunteered with the Peace Corps and was sent to Samoa, where she remained for two years.  During that time she also volunteered with the World Health Organization.

After returning to the United States, she went on to continue her education at Johns Hopkins University, where she earned a bachelor's degree and master's degree in nursing.

Healthcare career
She worked for two years as a registered nurse in the emergency department at the Mercy Medical Center in Baltimore, then went to work for the Centers for Disease Control and Prevention in their Epidemic Intelligence Service from 2004 to 2006.

In 2006 she moved to Colorado and worked as associate director of nursing at the Tri-County Health Department, serving Adams, Arapahoe, and Douglas Counties.  In 2009 she was appointed Chronic Disease Branch Director in the Colorado Department of Public Health and Environment, under Governor Bill Ritter.

In 2011, she returned to Wisconsin and was employed as Vice President of Clinical and Analytical Services at The Benefit Services Group, Inc., until 2014.  She then worked three years as Vice President of Clinical Services at Honeywell Life Care Solutions.  From 2017 until her campaign for the Assembly in 2020, she was vice president for Population Health and Integrated Care Management at Advocate Aurora Health.

Political career

In 2020, Rodriguez declared that she would be a candidate for Wisconsin State Assembly in the 13th assembly district, challenging incumbent Republican Rob Hutton.  Hutton was first elected after the Republican redistricting in 2012, which made the 13th district significantly more Republican—Hutton carried the district with 60% of the vote in 2012 and was unopposed in 2014 and 2016. Despite the redistricting plan, the 13th district had moved back toward Democrats—like several other suburban districts—over the course of the Trump presidency.  Hutton was in his fourth term in 2020 and had narrowly won re-election in 2018 with a margin of just 955 votes.

Rodriguez said she was inspired to run by Republican inaction around the 2020 spring election, which occurred during the first wave of the COVID-19 pandemic in Wisconsin.  She stated that, "when the Republican-led Legislature made people choose between their health and right to vote in the spring election, I just felt my background in health care and epidemiology would be helpful." Rodriguez prevailed in the November general election, winning the seat by 735 votes. She was one of only two candidates in Wisconsin to defeat an incumbent in the 2020 general election. Her seat, which had been redistricted to remove more liberal portions of Wauwatosa, was won by Republican Tom Michalski in the 2022 Wisconsin State Assembly election.

Personal life and family
Rodriguez is married with two children and resides in Brookfield, Wisconsin.

Electoral history

Wisconsin Assembly (2020)

| colspan="6" style="text-align:center;background-color: #e9e9e9;"| General Election, November 3, 2020

Wisconsin Lieutenant Governor (2022)

Democratic Primary

General

References

External links
 
 
 Campaign website
 

|-

|-

 

1975 births
21st-century American politicians
21st-century American women politicians
American women nurses
Centers for Disease Control and Prevention people
Illinois Wesleyan University alumni
Johns Hopkins University alumni
Lieutenant Governors of Wisconsin
Living people
Democratic Party members of the Wisconsin State Assembly
Peace Corps volunteers
People from Brookfield, Wisconsin
Women state legislators in Wisconsin